Powerlifting USA is an American international magazine covering the sport of powerlifting. The print issue magazine was published from June 1977 until May 2012 by Mike Lambert. The magazine featured powerlifting interviews, nutrition, training, meet results, and upcoming powerlifting competitions, as well as Top 100 rankings by weight class and men's and women's Top 50 rankings for the squat, bench press and deadlift.

Staff
 Editor-In-Chief/Publisher - Mike Lambert
 Controller - In Joo Lambert
 Statistician - Michael Soong
 Art Director - Kelly Anglin

References

External links
Official Website

Sports magazines published in the United States
Defunct magazines published in the United States
Fitness magazines
Magazines established in 1977
Magazines disestablished in 2012
Online magazines with defunct print editions
Magazines published in California